Charles-Louis d'Authville Des Amourettes (1716–1762) was an 18th-century French soldier.

He has written articles on the art of war for the Encyclopédie by Diderot and D'Alembert.

Note

Works 
1756: Essai sur la cavalerie tant ancienne que moderne auquel on a joint les instructions & les ordonnances nouvelles qui y ont rapport, avec l'état actuel des troupes à cheval, leur paye, &c., à Paris, chez Charles-Antoine Jombert, imprimeur-libraire du Corps royal de l'artillerie & du génie, rue Dauphine, à l'Image de Notre-Dame.
1762: L'Antilégionaire françois, ou le Conservateur des constitutions de l'infanterie, Wésel.
1756: Nicolas Deschamps (sieur des Landes, officier, précepteur du duc de Bourbon), Mémoires des deux dernières campagnes de M. de Turenne en Allemagne (...), nouvelle édition revue et corrigée par M. d'Authville Des Amourettes, N. Wilmer.

External links 
 Charles-Louis d’Authville Des Amourettes on Data.bnf.fr
 Essai sur la cavalerie tant ancienne que moderne... on Gallica

18th-century French writers
18th-century French male writers
Contributors to the Encyclopédie (1751–1772)
18th-century French military personnel
1716 births
1762 deaths